Sells (O'odham: Komkcʼeḍ ʼe-Wa:ʼosidk) is an unincorporated community and census-designated place (CDP) in Pima County, Arizona, United States. The population was 2,799 at the 2000 census.  It is the capital of the Tohono O'odham Nation and the home of several of their tribal businesses, such as Tohono O'Odham Ki:Ki Association. Originally named Indian Oasis, by cattle-ranchers/businessmen brothers, Joseph and Louis Ménager in 1912. The Ménager brothers also built and ran the Indian Oasis Mercantile Store. The settlement took its present English name in 1918 to honor Indian Commissioner Cato Sells. The O'odham name means "Tortoise Got Wedged".

Sells is near the Kitt Peak National Observatory.

Geography
Sells is located at  (31.914994, -111.875669).

Demographics

As of the census of 2000, there were 2,799 people, 690 households, and 565 families residing in the CDP. The racial makeup of the CDP was 96% Native American, 3% White, <1% Black or African American, <1% Asian, <1% from other races, and <1% from two or more races.  3% of the population were Hispanic or Latino of any race.

There were 690 households, out of which 42.3% had children under the age of 18 living with them, 26% were married couples living together, 44% had a female householder with no husband present, and 18% were non-families. 14% of all households were made up of individuals, and 2% had someone living alone who was 65 years of age or older.  The average household size was 4.0 and the average family size was 4.3.

In the CDP, the population was spread out, with 42% under the age of 18, 11% from 18 to 24, 27% from 25 to 44, 16% from 45 to 64, and 5% who were 65 years of age or older.  The median age was 23 years. For every 100 females, there were 93.3 males.  For every 100 females age 18 and over, there were 82.2 males.

The median income for a household in the CDP was $20,610, and the median income for a family was $20,294. Males had a median income of $25,278 versus $22,396 for females. The per capita income for the CDP was $6,283.  About 42% of families and 46% of the population were below the poverty line, including 51% of those under age 18 and 41% of those age 65 or over.

Education
Baboquivari Unified School District operates area public schools, while Tohono O'odham High School is a Bureau of Indian Affairs high school.

References

Census-designated places in Pima County, Arizona
Populated places in the Sonoran Desert
Seats of government of American Indian reservations
Tohono O'odham Nation